Anthony Godby Johnson is the subject and supposed author of the 1993 memoir A Rock and a Hard Place: One Boy's Triumphant Story. Subsequent investigations suggest that Johnson may have been the literary creation of Vicki Johnson, who purported to be Johnson's adoptive mother.

Writing career
The book initially appeared as an autobiography, describing Johnson's survival of an abusive childhood at the hands of his parents and their friends, his adoption by a new family, and his subsequent contraction of HIV/AIDS.

A second, lesser-known book was published under Johnson's name in 1994, entitled Love Letters to Hawaii from Aboard the A-Train.

Investigation

When several magazines and journalists, including Newsweek and Keith Olbermann, attempted to investigate the claims of the book and profile Anthony, they contacted the woman who claimed to be his adoptive mother, Vicki Johnson. Suspicion was raised when it was learned that no one other than Vicki Johnson had actually seen Anthony – not his agent, his editor, nor his publicist.  Further concerns were raised when a voice analysis expert analyzed calls from "Anthony" and identified the voice to be that of Vicki Johnson. As a result of these irregularities, Olbermann hired an investigator, who suggested that there was no Anthony and the story was fabricated.

A Rock and a Hard Place claimed that Anthony's biological parents were arrested and tried for abusing him, and that his police officer father was killed in prison. An alleged conspiracy of rogue police officers trying to kill Anthony was Vicki Johnson's justification for zealously preserving Anthony's privacy. However, no case matching that description could be found at any social service agency.

Many sources found it medically implausible that Anthony could be alive, given that he had supposedly been living with AIDS for over 19 years. Most long-term survivors are actually living with HIV but had not yet developed AIDS; furthermore, the medications that slow the progress of the disease were not known at the time that Anthony's AIDS allegedly became severe.

With so many similarities between the purported life of Anthony and proven hoaxes such as that of Kaycee Nicole and Kodee Kennings, the prevailing belief is that Anthony never existed.

Further investigation by snopes.com has turned up still more evidence that Anthony never existed. No birth records are available for Anthony and adoption is a time consuming and lengthy legal process. The state of New York has no record of a boy by that name or fitting that description having ever been adopted by anyone with his supposed adoptive mother's name. Even in a time before computers, it would have been impossible to adopt a child without creating a paper trail. Also, in his book Anthony stated that his biological father was an ex-police officer in New York, and that he had been tried, convicted, and killed in prison. However, no record exists of a police officer with his supposed biological father's name, and the New York State Department of Corrections and Community Supervision lists no inmate by that name having ever been incarcerated, let alone killed in prison. Were these things true, verification could easily be obtained by internet searches or Freedom of Information Act requests. Lastly, no court records exist which list a couple with the names of Anthony's supposed biological mother and father, who were supposedly tried and convicted of the crimes Anthony alleged in his book.

Aftermath
Paul Monette wrote a foreword for an edition of A Rock and a Hard Place, later defending the book's veracity. Armistead Maupin, who wrote a blurb for an edition of A Rock and a Hard Place, later wrote The Night Listener, a novel subsequently made into a film, in which the main character begins correspondence with an HIV-positive boy who is not what he seems. The book parallels Maupin's experience with Johnson. The story was also adapted for a 2002 episode of Law & Order: Criminal Intent entitled "Faith", with the child's sex being changed to female and the illness to amyotrophic lateral sclerosis.

On January 12, 2007, the ABC newsmagazine program 20/20 revealed new evidence that Anthony was Vicki Johnson's fictional creation. The photo of "Anthony" that Vicki had sent to Anthony's supporters was revealed to be a childhood photo of a healthy adult man who was shocked to find his childhood photo being represented to people as that of Anthony Godby Johnson; one childhood teacher of this man had been Vicki Johnson, who was said to have taken pictures of the children in her class.

Vicki Johnson, whose real name was Joanne Vicki Fraginals, had allegedly handed Anthony over to another caretaker in 1997 when she moved to Chicago and married Marc Zackheim, a child psychologist and owner of the Associates of Clinical Psychology. In 2004, Zackheim was indicted for abusing child patients at a treatment center for troubled children in Indiana; his trial began in 2006 at the Marshall County courthouse. He was acquitted of one felony count of practicing medicine without a license and three misdemeanor counts of battery for inappropriately touching boys.

Three years later Zackheim was found in court again, confessing to accepting Medicaid for patients no longer in his clinic, accepting payments before services had been provided or for services never received, billing for therapeutic services when no licensed therapist was on site, billing for more expensive therapy services than provided, and fabricating diagnosis. In 2009 Marc Allen Zackheim was charged and sentenced to prison in federal court on felony charges for aiding and abetting health care fraud.<ref>wbst.com Plymouth psychologist pleads guilty to Medicaid fraud" ] </ref>

Zackheim died of a heart attack in November 2009 before his sentence was served.http://articles.southbendtribune.com/2009-11-21/news/26743885_1_medicaid-fraud-lake-forest-hospital-prison-for-health-care/  "Heart attack claims Plymouth Psychologist Accused in Medicaid Fraud- Zackheim was ordered to prison for Medicaid fraud

ABC subsequently ran an update to the story, which included a 147-page response from Vicki Johnson's lawyer in response to ABC's questions. ABC also reported that Johnson and Zackheim have both died since their original 2007 story. Since the alleged death of Vicki Johnson, Anthony has seemingly vanished and has not been in contact with any of his previous supporters, lending credence to the assertion that he never existed. Since Vicki has supposedly died, the truth or fiction of Anthony and his story cannot be verified, leaving the story without resolution. Though the majority of people now believe that he never existed, there are still some people that believe that Anthony is/was real, and with the death of Vicki Johnson, their claims cannot be completely disproven.

See alsoCatfish - documentary film about a deceptive online relationship
Janet Cooke - journalist awarded the Pulitzer Prize for an article later admitted to be false
James Frey - author of A Million Little Pieces, a memoir found to be heavily fictionalized and later re-issued as semi-fiction
Dave Pelzer - author of a memoir reporting his abuse as a child, events which were alleged to be invented or exaggerated
JT LeRoy - author of a memoir reporting to be an abused teen hustler that turned out to be a literary hoax

References

Sources
Tad Friend, "Virtual Love", The New Yorker. November 26, 2001 (pp. 86–89)

External links
 Rick Miller, Anthony Godby Johnson, The Invisible Boy Part I on the Everything Armistead'' blog, 2006-08-03. [https://web.archive.org/web/20160312064029/http://armisteadmaupin.com/blog/?p=341 archive edition
Snopes.com on Kaycee Nicole and Anthony Godby Johnson
 Keith Olbermann, Heartbreaking Hoax - 2006-08-04 Countdown with Keith Olbermann.
 
 The Ghost Writer

1993 hoaxes
Fictional adoptees
Fictional characters from New York (state)
Fictional characters introduced in 1993
Fictional characters with HIV/AIDS
Fictional writers
Literary forgeries
Nonexistent people used in hoaxes